The 2000 WNBA All-Star Game was played on July 17, 2000, at America West Arena in Phoenix, Arizona. This was the 2nd annual WNBA All-Star Game.

The All-Star Game

Rosters

1 Injured
2 Starting in place of injured player

Coaches
The coach for the Western Conference was Houston Comets coach Van Chancellor. The coach for the Eastern Conference was New York Liberty coach Richie Adubato.

References

Wnba All-star Game, 2000
Women's National Basketball Association All-Star Game